Vadakkemuri is a village in Kottayam district in the state of Kerala, India.

Demographics
 India census, Vadakkemuri had a population of 18022 with 8783 males and 9239 females.

References

Villages in Kottayam district